Milton Montgomery (May 3, 1825May 23, 1897) was a colonel in the Union Army during the American Civil War who was nominated and confirmed for appointment to the grade of brevet brigadier general in 1866.

Biography
Montgomery was born on May 3, 1825 in Olivesburg, Ohio. He later moved to Sparta, Wisconsin. Montgomery died on May 23, 1897 in Omaha, Nebraska, and is buried in Wyuka Cemetery.

Career
Montgomery began his Civil War service in command of the 25th Wisconsin Infantry Regiment on September 14, 1862. He suffered the loss of his right arm at Decatur, Georgia, during the Battle of Atlanta, where he was captured on July 22, 1864. He subsequently was exchanged. Despite the loss of his arm, Montgomery later took part in the Carolinas Campaign. He commanded the 2nd Brigade, 1st Division, XVII Corps of the Army of the Tennessee from January 29, 1865, to March 28, 1865, and from May 20, 1865, to June 7, 1865. Montgomery was mustered out of the volunteers on June 7, 1865. On January 13, 1866, President Andrew Johnson nominated Montgomery for appointment to the grade of brevet brigadier general of volunteers to rank from March 13, 1865, and the United States Senate confirmed the appointment on March 12, 1866.

References

People from Richland County, Ohio
People from Sparta, Wisconsin
People of Wisconsin in the American Civil War
Union Army colonels
American amputees
1825 births
1897 deaths